The Flemish Sportsjewel is an annual award given to a Flemish sportsperson or -team, either following a remarkable achievement or at the end of an exceptional career in sports.
 
Each individual can only win the award once during his or her career, making this trophy one of the most prestigious in Flemish sports. The trophy is awarded by the Flemish Administration represented by the Flemish Minister for Sport, and was first handed out in 1982.

Winners

See also
Belgian Sportsman of the year
Belgian Sports Personality of the Year

References 

National sportsperson-of-the-year trophies and awards
Belgian sports trophies and awards
Awards established in 1982
1982 establishments in Belgium